Partners of Fate is a 1921 American silent drama film directed by Bernard Durning. It is not known whether the film currently survives.

Plot
Helen Meriless is married to Byron Millard, while Frances Lloyd is married to John Fraser. Both couples are dysfunctional with Helen and John being the better partners. They all end up on the same ship for their honeymoon. The ship sinks with both couples ending up with each other's spouses on two separate islands. Frances and Byron end up cheating on their spouses with each other, while Helen and John do not break their vows. Byron and Frances are rescued, and leave their spouses. Helen and John reach civilization much later. When they do, Helen arrives at her house to find Byron and Frances living with each other, causing a panicked Frances to shoot both Byron and herself. The film ends with the now spouseless Helen and John deciding to marry each other.

Cast
Louise Lovely as Helen Meriless
William Scott as John Fraser
Rosemary Theby as Frances Lloyd
Philo McCullough as Byron Millard
George Siegmann as Purser
Richard Cummings as Bill Ricketts

References

External links

1921 films
American silent feature films
1921 drama films
Silent American drama films
American black-and-white films
Films directed by Bernard Durning
1920s American films
1920s English-language films